Arion lusitanicus, also known by its common name Portuguese slug, is a species of air-breathing land slug, a terrestrial pulmonate gastropod mollusk in the family Arionidae.

Distribution

Arion lusitanicus is endemic to forests of the western Lisbon Region (such as the Sintra-Cascais Natural Park or the Arrábida Natural Park) in Portugal.

Description
In slugs it is often difficult to establish good criteria for identifying species using external features or internal features, as colouration can be quite variable, and the rather plastic anatomy makes diagnostic anatomical features difficult to establish.

It is a rather large (up to 80 mm long) slug of reddish-brown colour. There are  two light brown bands on the dorsum and mantle, the right band passes above the pneumostome. The margin of the foot is reddish or yellowish with dark transverse lines reaching into the lateral parts of the sole. The sole is olive greyish with  darker marginal zones. The tentacles are blackish.

Genitalia: Atrium spherical and undivided, spermatheca ovoid, spermatheca duct as long as spermatheca or slightly shorter, getting slightly wider near insertion at atrium, epiphallus longer than vas deferens, vagina longer and wider than spermatheca duct.

Taxonomy

The more well known Spanish slug Arion vulgaris (Moquin-Tandon, 1855) was for a time misidentified as Arion lusitanicus, but the two slugs are not very closely related, differing in internal anatomy, shape of spermatophore and number of chromosomes.

References

External links
 Arion lusitanicus at Animalbase taxonomy, short description, distribution, biology, status (threats), images 
Arion lusitanicus images at Encyclopedia of Life

Arion (gastropod)
Endemic fauna of Portugal
Gastropods described in 1868
Taxa named by Jules François Mabille